The Assembly of the Cuban Resistance (abbreviated ACR) is a coalition of anti-government human rights groups inside and outside Cuba. Their members are signatories of the "Agreement for Democracy in Cuba" drafted in 1998, and "My Signature for my Dignity" in 2020. The ACR considers the Castro regime illegal, and supports free elections and the release of all political prisoners.

The ACR combines street action mobilization with high-level lobbying. It is an influential coalition internationally, among the Cuban diaspora and the island's civil society. It has launched campaigns like "All for a Free Cuba" and "Don't Aid", organized multiple protests inside and outside the island, participated in international forums, and supported the establishment of an international tribunal for the prosecution of crimes against humanity in Cuba.

The Assembly of the Cuban Resistance works closely with and coordinates with Cuban exile communities in diverse cities in the United States and abroad. In the states of New Jersey, Illinois, California, Texas, Puerto Rico, and in the Dominican Republic.

History 
The ACR was founded on 18 March 2009, on the 6th anniversary of the Cuban “Black Spring” to map out a democratic transition in Cuba.

In 2015, the Assembly was invited to participate in a Civil Society Forum in Panama during the VII Summit of the Americas. Members of the Cuban government's state organizations, who opposed the participation of the ACR, organized an act of repudiation (acto de repudio) against the Cuban activists and, in the Belisario Porras Park, attacked the representatives of the ACR who were laying flowers before a bust of José Martí.

Activities

Political Influence 
The ACR meets with political leaders and diplomats, some of the most recent meetings include (1) a roundtable on “Supporting the People of Venezuela” with President Trump on 10 June 2020; (2) a meeting with Chilean Minister of Foreign Affairs Teodoro Ribera Neumann on 6 March 2020; (3) with Taiwanese President Tsai Ing-wen on 11 October 2019; (4) with the Costa Rican Minister of Foreign Affairs Manuel E. Ventura Robles on 22 February 2019; (5) with President Bolsonaro on 20 December 2018; (6) with OAS Secretary General Luis Almagro on 21 September 2018; (7) a Summit of the Union of Latin American Political Parties (Unión de Partidos Latinoamericanos - UPLA) with Chilean President Sebastián Piñera on 7 June 2018; (8) a meeting with Governor of Florida Rick Scott on 18 May 2018; (9) with Peruvian Vice-president Mercedes Rosalba Aráoz Fernandez, (10) Peruvian Minister of Justice and Human Rights Salvador Heresi, (11) the president of the Peruvian Congress, Luis Galarreta, (12) and the U.S. Ambassador to the OAS Carlos Trujillo in April 2018; (13) and Vice-president Mike Pence on 16 June 2017.
On 30 July 2020, the ACR sent a letter to the executives of Netflix, urging them to cease promotion of The Wasp Network film as they argued that the plot of the movie was not based on real events, that the Cuban exiled community was treated as terrorists, and that the families of the victims of the Brothers to the Rescue Massacre had no opportunity to tell their side of the story on this streaming platform. The letter was also signed by the mayor of Miami, Francis Suarez; the mayor of Doral, Florida, Juan Carlos Bermudez; and Nicaraguan and Venezuelan leaders.

In 2018, the ACR's “Don’t Aid” campaign, consisting of public information, advocacy in media, gathering support from local public officials, and protests, aided other public diplomacy efforts aimed at ending cruise tourism to Cuba that directly benefited the Cuban military.

In 2019, the ACR campaigned in support of efforts by members of the U.S. Congress and Administration officials to end the suspension of Title III and IV of the Helms-Burton Act, a law that, for the first time, allowed American citizens to sue companies that benefited from private properties that had been confiscated in Cuba.

On 13 April 2016, the ACR spoke before the Miami Beach Commission to oppose the establishment of a Cuban consulate in the area, which had been proposed by the Mayor of Miami Beach. The city commission voted 4–3 in favor of the Assembly and residents.

International 
The Assembly of the Cuban Resistance cooperates with human rights activists in Venezuela, Nicaragua, Bolivia, Chile, Peru, Brazil, the Dominican Republic, Mexico, and Uruguay. On 24 February 2019, the ACR invited Venezuelan and Nicaraguan activists to the Congress of the Resistance, where it launched the “Yes We Can” campaign.

The Assembly was one of the organizations invited to the VIII Summit of the Americas on 13 and 14 April 2018 in Lima, Peru.

Campaigns 
Inside Cuba, member organizations created the “Pa la Calle” campaign that promotes protests in the streets to call for democracy and the respect of human rights. The activities include “pots and pans cacerolazo” protests, prayer chains, and protests in the streets in provinces like Villa Clara, Havana, Pinar del Rio, Holguin, Granma, Las Tunas, Cienfuegos, Camaguey, Santiago de Cuba, Matanzas, and Ciego de Avila.

In 2016, the ACR launched the “All for a Free Cuba” campaign, a plan for the "liberation, democratization, and reconstruction" of the island with the participation of Cuban activists and leaders, inside and outside Cuba. On 11 October 2016, over a thousand people gathered at the Miami Airport Hilton hotel to support the campaign.

Protests 
The ACR has organized protests in the United States, where the majority of the Cuban exiled community lives in February 2014, June 2015, March and December 2016, July 2018, and November 2019. On 30 November 2016, thousands of people participated in a protest organized by the ACR after the death of Fidel Castro.

On 26 February 2010, members of the ACR occupied the Brazilian consulate in Miami for about an hour in order to bring attention to the death of political prisoner Orlando Zapata Tamayo in a Cuban prison as Brazilian President Lula da Silva was visiting the island.

The Assembly has organized several caravans of cars in Miami: For instance, on 29 October 2018, to protest cruise tourism to the island.

References 

Human rights organizations based in Cuba